Kathavarayan is a 2008 Tamil language action comedy-drama film directed by Salangai Durai starring Karan, Vidisha and Vadivelu.

Plot
The film revolves around Kathavarayan, who sells illicit arrack in Hogenakkal. Though he is involved in arrack trade, he is honourable. Malti, a student, arrives in the village as part of her NSS project. She vows to end the arrack menace in the village and takes efforts to arrest Kathavarayan. Thanks to her efforts, Kathavarayan is arrested and imprisoned in Chennai.

Parallel narration is the comedy track of Karuppu (Vaigai Puyal Vadivelu).

Call it fate, Malti is arrested for no fault of her own in Chennai. Her efforts to expose drug-peddlers in Chennai backfires. They hatch a conspiracy and Malti falls a prey to it. She is arrested for possessing drugs and is imprisoned.

Kathavarayan leaves jail to retaliate against Malti. But he learns her real intentions and dire situation. He masterminds joins the drug-peddling gang and eventually exposes them to save Malti.

Cast
 Karan as Kathavarayan
 Vidisha as Malti
 Vadivelu as 'Kandhuvetti' Karuppu
 Radha as Sarrosa
 Dhandapani as Easwaran
 Ilavarasu as Police inspector
 Halwa Vasu
 Singamuthu
 Muthukaalai
 T. P. Gajendran
 Chaams
 Thalapathy Dinesh

Production
The film was initially offered to Sibiraj, though his refusal meant that Karan was chosen to play the lead role.

Soundtrack
Soundtrack was composed by Srikanth Deva and lyrics were written by Snehan.

Reception
The movie received mixed to negative reviews from critics

Sify wrote, "Karan's performance is loud and boorish, at times irritating with his Kovai Tamil. Radha definitely has a future as a glam girl while heroine Vidisha is earnest, but a poorly written role mars her chances. Ilavarasu, Kadhal Dhandapani are also there along with a sick comedy track of Vadivelu as an idiot moneylender who gets beaten up by all and sundry. There is nothing to hum about the music of Dheena."

Behindwoods wrote, "Kathavarayan is a small film made with good intentions and commercial compulsions. Its theme, being alien to urban audiences, may put the film out of favor with the A center audiences. But it does stand a chance in the smaller centers. The laughs provided by Vadivelu who keeps appearing in little doses throughout the movie is another positive and there are others like Ilavarasu and Muthukalai who do not create much of an impact. Kadhal Dandapaani does another stereotypical, loud mouthing baddie, nothing unexpected here. Debutant director Salangai Durai may not have made a dream debut but this start is not disappointing."

Indiaglitz wrote, "Karan has come up with a matured performance. He is good in dance and stunt sequence. His diction of the Kovai Tamil also deserve a special mention. Debutant Vidisha does a decent job. She plays her part well. Vadivelu plays a money-lender who lands in trouble for no fault of his. Salangai Durai deserve a pat for coming out with a strong message. But had he cut down on preaching, the movie would have been different."

Awards
Vadivelu won the Tamil Nadu State Film Award for Best Comedian for the film.

References

2008 films
2000s Tamil-language films
Films scored by Srikanth Deva